The Paramount is a diner-style restaurant in the Beacon Hill neighborhood of downtown Boston, Massachusetts, United States. Situated at 44 Charles Street, it was established in 1937. It is owned by Michael Bissanti, Michael Conlon and Joe Greene, three college friends from La Salle Academy in New York City.

The restaurant has a policy by which no patron, or a member of a patron's party, may occupy a table until their food is ready. It was implemented to ensure that other patrons, more often than not, can find a table when their food is ready.

In 2015, the restaurant was sued after employees claimed they were underpaid for overtime worked.

A second location was opened at 667 East Broadway in South Boston in December 2011.

The restaurant won the Best of Boston "Best Beacon Hill Restaurant" award in 2009.

References

External links

1937 establishments in Massachusetts
Buildings and structures in Boston
Restaurants established in 1937
Restaurants in Boston
Beacon Hill, Boston